Michal Trávníček (born March 14, 1980) is a Czech professional ice hockey player. He was selected by the Toronto Maple Leafs in the 8th round (228th overall) of the 1998 NHL Entry Draft.

Trávníček has played with HC Litvínov in the Czech Extraliga since the 1998–99 Czech Extraliga season. He has also played few regular seasons games for HC Zlín in the 2005–06 season. In 2000, two years after his NHL draft year, he went to play for Toronto's AHL affiliate St. John's Maple Leafs. He played there during two seasons, the whole 2000–01 AHL season and part of the 2001–02 season during which he returned to the Czech Extraliga and HC Litvínov.

Trávníček has played for the Czech Republic men's national ice hockey team in the Euro Hockey Tour. He has also played for the Czech Republic men's national junior ice hockey team. In November 1999, in a game against Sweden in Helsinki, Trávníček attacked Swedish forward Mattias Weinhandl, whose left eye was injured after being struck with the blade of Trávníček's stick. After the incident, Trávníček was suspended from international hockey for three years by the International Ice Hockey Federation. The Swede was permanently injured in the eye and only has 10% vision, despite Trávníček's doing, he managed to play several games in the NHL. Less than a year before, in the 1999 World Junior Ice Hockey Championships, he was suspended for two games after spitting on a linesman.

Playing career
 1998/1999 HC Chemopetrol Litvínov
 1999/2000 HC Chemopetrol Litvínov
 2000/2001 St. John's Maple Leafs (AHL)
 2001/2002 St. John's Maple Leafs (AHL), 2001/2002 HC Chemopetrol Litvínov
 2002/2003 HC Chemopetrol Litvínov
 2003/2004 HC Chemopetrol Litvínov
 2004/2005 HC Chemopetrol Litvínov
 2005/2006 HC Chemopetrol Litvínov, PSG Zlín
 2006/2007 HC Chemopetrol Litvínov
 2007/2008 HC Litvínov, HC Havířov
 2008/2009 HC Litvínov
 2009/2010 HC Benzina Litvínov
 2010/2011 HC Benzina Litvínov
 2011/2012 HC Verva Litvínov
 2012/2013 HC Verva Litvínov
 2013/2014 HC Verva Litvínov

References

External links

1980 births
Czech ice hockey left wingers
HC Litvínov players
HC Most players
PSG Berani Zlín players
St. John's Maple Leafs players
Living people
Toronto Maple Leafs draft picks
People from Děčín
Sportspeople from the Ústí nad Labem Region
Czech expatriate ice hockey players in Canada